The 1996–97 season for Huddersfield Town failed to carry on the good work of the previous and nearly saw Town relegated back to Division Two. Following the heavy spending on players in the closed season, much was expected of the Terriers in the 1996–97 season but, despite a bright start from new striker Marcus Stewart, Horton was unable to improve on the team's consistently poor away form that had ended the side's playoff bid the previous year. Long-term injuries to Stewart and Andy Morrison did little to help things and, with the previously strong home form becoming increasingly patchy, the Terriers struggled at the wrong end of the table. It was perhaps the least celebrated summer signing, Andy Payton, who notched an impressive tally of 20 goals and helped staved off the threat of relegation as the side scrambled to 20th, just 8 points and 2 places above the drop zone.

Injuries and illness forced Town to play 35 players during the season, then a record, which would actually be broken the following season. Brian Horton's job was seemingly under threat, although he wouldn't leave the McAlpine Stadium until October 1997.

Squad at the start of the season

Review
Town made a promising start beating Charlton Athletic 2–0 in front of the highest home crowd for an opening day game for 24 years. This was followed up by wins over Ipswich Town, Oldham Athletic, Reading & Birmingham City, but then a spell of 9 games without a win including a 6–0 hiding at Swindon Town left manager Brian Horton in the lurch.

Form wasn't helped by the consistent injuries to top players such as Marcus Stewart and Andy Morrison, but Town slowly tried to recover, but their best run of the season came during the Christmas and New Year period when they went 5 games unbeaten, but they then went on a run of 1 win in 10, which propelled them into relegation territory.

By the end of the season, top scorer Andy Payton's goals were starting to dry up, but a win on the penultimate day of the season against already relegated Southend United made certain that Town would play Division 1 football the next season.

Squad at the end of the season

Results

Division One

FA Cup

League Cup

Appearances and goals

References

1996-97
Hudd